Anna Katarina Timglas (born 24 November 1985 in Malmö, Sweden) was a Swedish ice hockey player. She won a silver medal at the 2006 Winter Olympics.
She has been an ice hockey referee since 2012.

References

1985 births
Living people
Ice hockey players at the 2006 Winter Olympics
Ice hockey players at the 2010 Winter Olympics
Medalists at the 2006 Winter Olympics
Olympic ice hockey players of Sweden
Olympic medalists in ice hockey
Olympic silver medalists for Sweden
Sportspeople from Malmö
Swedish women's ice hockey forwards
21st-century Swedish women